József Szekó (21 December 1954 – 27 September 2019) was a Hungarian politician, member of the National Assembly (MP) from Fidesz Baranya County Regional List from 2010 to 2014. He was elected Mayor of Mohács on 18 October 1998. He served in this capacity until his death.

Szekó was appointed a member of the Committee on Local Government and Regional Development on May 14, 2010, holding the position until May 5, 2014.

References

1954 births
2019 deaths
Hungarian mechanical engineers
Mayors of places in Hungary
Fidesz politicians
Members of the National Assembly of Hungary (2010–2014)
People from Mohács